Walter Giger (born September 6, 1943 in Zürich) is a Swiss chemist. He had been working at the Swiss Federal Institute of Aquatic Science and Technology (Eawag), where he was the head of the division Chemische Problemstoffe. He has been a professor for environmental chemistry at the ETH Zurich since 1995.

Giger is a pioneer who advanced the field of trace organic analysis and its application to significant environmental problems. His research topics include development of analytical techniques for identification of organic pollutants in drinking water, wastewater and natural waters. He investigates their sources, occurrence and fate. In 1984, he discovered that in wastewater treatment plants nonylphenol ethoxylates are transformed to 4-nonylphenols, which are toxic to aquatic life. After several additional studies the use of nonylphenols and nonylphenol ethoxylates was restricted in the European Union in 2003.

Scientific career 
Giger received his PhD in chemistry from ETH Zurich in 1971. In 1972, he was a Postdoc at the Woods Hole Oceanographic Institution. In the same year, he took a new place of employment at the Eawag in Dübendorf and stayed there till his retirement. In the meantime, he was visiting scientist at the Stanford University and lecturer at the Universität Karlsruhe. In 2002, he became a member of the ISI Highly Cited Researchers Database.

In September 2008, the journal Environmental Science & Technology dedicated a special issue to him.

Literature 
 Naomi Lubick: Scaling Peaks: The Life and Science of Walter Giger. Environmental Science & Technology, 42(17), 2008,

References

External links 
 

Swiss chemists
Academic staff of ETH Zurich
Scientists from Zürich
Living people
1943 births